Cookie Monster is a blue Muppet character on the long-running PBS/HBO children's television show Sesame Street. In a song in 2004, and later in an interview in 2017, Cookie Monster revealed his real name as "Sid". He is best known for his voracious appetite and his famous eating catchphrases, such as "Me want cookie!" As his name suggests, his preferred food is cookies; though he eats almost anything, including inedible objects. Chocolate chip cookies are his favorite kind. His speech is often grammatically incorrect; he always uses "Me" to refer to himself in place of "I","My", and "Mine". Despite his voracious appetite for cookies, Cookie Monster shows awareness of healthy eating habits for young children and also enjoys fruits and vegetables.

He is known to have a mother, a younger sister, and a cousin, identical in design,  who does not like cookies. All three share his characteristic blue fur and "googly eyes". He also has a father, who appeared in a Monsterpiece Theater sketch promoting energy conservation, water conservation and environmentalism. Cookie Monster's mother and father both share his enormous appetite and craving for cookies.

Origin
The book Jim Henson's Designs and Doodles explains Cookie Monster's origin as follows: "In 1966, Henson drew three monsters that ate cookies and appeared in a General Foods commercial that featured three crunchy snack foods: Wheels, Crowns and Flutes. Each snack was represented by a different monster. The Wheel-Stealer was a short, fuzzy monster with wonky eyes and sharply pointed teeth. The Flute-Snatcher was a speed demon with a long, sharp nose and windblown hair. The Crown-Grabber was a hulk of a monster with a Boris Karloff accent and teeth that resembled giant knitting needles."

"These monsters had insatiable appetites for the snack foods they were named after. Each time the Muppet narrator, a human-looking fellow, fixes himself a tray of Wheels, Flutes and Crowns, they disappear before he can eat them. One by one, the monsters sneak in and zoom away with the snacks. Frustrated and peckish, the narrator warns viewers that these pesky monsters could be disguised as someone in your own home, at which point the monsters briefly turn into people and then dissolve back to monsters again."

As it turns out, these commercials were never aired — but all three monsters had a future in the Muppet cast. The "Crown-Grabber" was used in a sketch on The Ed Sullivan Show, in which he ruins a girl's beautiful day. Known from then on as the Beautiful Day Monster, he made a number of appearances on Sesame Street and The Muppet Show. The "Flute-Snatcher" turned into Snake Frackle, a background monster from The Great Santa Claus Switch and The Muppet Show.

In 1967, Henson used the "Wheel-Stealer" puppet for an IBM training film called Coffee Break Machine. In the sketch, called "The Computer Dinner", the monster (with frightening eyes and fangs) devours a complex coffee making machine as it describes its different parts. When he is finished, the machine announces the monster has activated the machine's anti-vandalism system, which contains the most powerful explosives known to man. The monster promptly explodes. This sketch was also performed in October 1967 on The Ed Sullivan Show. It was also later performed on the George Burns episode of The Muppet Show using the Luncheon Counter Monster.

Two years later, Henson used a similarly-designed and equally hungry monster for three commercials selling Munchos, a Frito-Lay potato snack. This time, the puppet was called Arnold, the Munching Monster. After the three ads were produced, Henson had the opportunity to renew the contract. He chose not to, because at that point he was working on Sesame Street — and that monster puppet was moving on to the next stage in his career. According to Frank Oz, in a later routine the then unnamed monster won a quiz show and for winning was "given the choice of $10,000 cash, a new car, a trip to Hawaii, or a cookie." He took the cookie and from then on he was Cookie Monster.

Cookie Monster, still unnamed, made his Sesame Street debut in the first episode, interfering with Kermit the Frog's "famous W lecture" by eating a model "W" bit by bit. He turns it into an "N", a "V", and finally an "I", to Kermit's frustration. He then tries to eat Kermit.

It was during the first season that Cookie Monster got his name and began using the growly vernacular (e.g., "Me eat cookie!") that would become part of his character. His signature song, "C Is For Cookie", was first aired during the 1971–72 season, and it became one of the best-known songs from Sesame Street.

Development

In 2006, in response to growing concerns about record levels of childhood obesity in the United States, Sesame Street began airing segments titled Healthy Habits for Life. In these segments, the Muppet characters of Sesame Street talk about healthy habits, such as eating properly and exercising. The Healthy Habits for Life segments spawned Internet rumors that Cookie Monster's name had been changed to Veggie Monster or would be taken off the show entirely.

In a 2007 appearance on Martha Stewart's TV program, Cookie Monster explained his new philosophy that "Cookies are a sometimes food."

On February 10, 2008, NPR host Elizabeth Blair interviewed Cookie Monster for the All Things Considered segment In Character. He answered the Proust Questionnaire, as well as revealing some of his favorite and non-favorite things.

In a June 19, 2008, appearance on The Colbert Report, Cookie Monster again explained that "Cookies are a sometimes food." Colbert had asked agitatedly why Cookie Monster had "abandoned the pro-cookie agenda" and thus caused fruit to become the favorite snack of American children, according to a study Colbert had heard. Colbert criticized Cookie Monster for not wearing a cookie lapel pin. Cookie Monster also claimed to have "crazy times during the '70s and '80s", referring to himself as "the Robert Downey Jr. of cookies." After eating a cookie to prove he still likes cookies, Cookie Monster asked if the Peabody Award, a round medallion on a small pedestal, was a cookie. When Colbert returned to speak to Cookie Monster at the end of the show, the award had disappeared and Cookie Monster was wiping his mouth with a napkin.

On November 24, 2010, Cookie Monster started a Facebook page as part of a campaign to host Saturday Night Live. Though his bid to host Saturday Night Live failed, he was allowed to appear with Jeff Bridges when Jeff hosted the show and sang the Christmas song "Silver Bells".

Casting historyMain performers'''
Frank Oz – From 1969 to 2001; occasionally until 2004
David Rudman – From 2001 to present

Rudman officially became Cookie Monster in Sesame Street's 2002 season (taped 2001). Oz continued to occasionally perform Cookie Monster until 2004.

Merchandise
Various toys and other icons of the Cookie Monster have been produced over the years. The most obvious is a cookie jar, of which numerous types have been available.

Numerous children's books featuring Cookie Monster have been published over the years:Happy Birthday, Cookie MonsterCookie Monster's KitchenCookie Monster's ChristmasA Cookie Gone Wrong - Monster's StoryBiggest Cookie in the WorldCookie Monster and the Cookie TreeCookie Monster's Good Time to EatCookie Monster's Blue BookCookie Monster, Where are You?Cookie Monster!Cookie Monster's Activity BookCookie Monster Mammoth ColorCookie Monster's Book of Cookie ShapesMonster and the Surprise CookieSesame Street: Wanted, the Great Cookie ThiefCultural references
Familiar to generations of Sesame Street watchers, Cookie Monster is remembered for his gluttony and his deep, rumbly distinctive voice.

Immoderation
In 1990 U.S. Budget Director Richard Darman wrote an introduction to the federal budget with a section "Green Eyeshades and the Cookie Monster" in which he called Cookie "the quintessential consumer", and the enormous budget "the Ultimate Cookie Monster."
In the Food Network program Good Eats episode "Three Chips for Sister Marsha" (first aired December 13, 2000), a puppet named Maj. Wilfred D. Cookie who looks like a green version of Cookie Monster appears. Asked about his well-known "brother", he responds, "I told you never to mention that ruffian. All he knows about cookies is how to shovel them into his face." In the Fox animated series Family Guy episode "Model Misbehavior", Cookie Monster is shown in a psychiatric hospital, repeatedly foiling drug rehab-styled efforts to cure his cookie addiction.

In the Sesame Street parody Avenue Q, the character of Trekkie Monster is loosely based on Cookie Monster, sharing his speech pattern and addictive personality.

Music
The guttural singing style in death metal bands is commonly (if facetiously) compared to Cookie Monster's low-pitched, gravelly voice.

John Lennon's song "Hold On", recorded in 1970 (only a year after Sesame Street debuted), features Lennon shouting "Cookie!" in Cookie Monster's voice, in the middle of the instrumental break in an otherwise calm, quiet song. Ringo Starr, aware of Lennon's love for Cookie Monster, also screams "Cookie!" in Cookie Monster's voice in his song "Early 1970", released in 1971.

Entertainment
In the Family Guy episode "Back to the Pilot", due to alterations in the past, Stewie thinks Cookie Monster could have invented Facebook; in this timeline, he would have called it "Cookiebook". In The Empire Strikes Back spoof "Something, Something, Something, Dark Side", Cookie Monster is cast as the Wampa.

In another sci-fi related takeoff, the Star Wars spoof Hardware Wars features "Chewchilla the Wookiee Monster" in the role of Chewbacca.

Cookie Monster also appears in Mad, first in "Mouse M.D", a parody of House M.D., then as the main character in "Cookie Blue", a parody of Rookie Blue.

Apple
When the Apple personal assistant Siri is asked the question, "what is zero divided by zero", Siri responds with the answer: "Imagine that you have zero cookies and you split them evenly among zero friends. How many cookies does each person get? See? It doesn’t make sense. And Cookie Monster is sad that there are no cookies, and you are sad that you have no friends."Stephanie Webber, "Cookie Monster Responds to Siri's Amazing Zero Divided By Zero Answer", Us Weekly, 1 July 2015.

On March 16, 2016, Apple released an ad titled "Timer" starring Cookie Monster, where he uses the "Hey Siri" feature in the iPhone 6S to set a timer and play an album while he waits for cookies to bake.

Other
A popular internet parody of The Great Wave off Kanagawa'', titled "Sea is for Cookie", was created for a Reddit Adobe Photoshop competition. The piece features the wave with googly eyes and cookies in the crest, resembling Cookie Monster eating cookies.

See also
Cookie Monster Munch
C Is For Cookie
Cookie Monster vocals

References
This article incorporates Creative Commons license CC-BY SA 3.0 text from the Muppet Wiki article "Cookie Monster".

External links
Public Broadcasting System - Sesame Street

Television characters introduced in 1966
Fictional chefs
Sesame Street Muppet characters
Fictional monsters
Cookies in popular culture

de:Sesamstraße#Krümelmonster